Harris Field is a college baseball park in the western United States, located in Lewiston, Idaho. An on-campus venue with a seating capacity of 5,000, it is the home field of the Warriors of Lewis–Clark State College, a top program in National Association of Intercollegiate Athletics (NAIA). Since 1984, LCSC has won nineteen national titles and had six runner-up finishes.

The ballpark became Harris Field  in 1950, while the college was known as North Idaho College of Education (NICE) and its teams were the Loggers. It was named for Loyd Harris (1883–1969), a local businessman, civic leader, and baseball booster. He was active in baseball as a player, manager, and club director since 1904. Previously, the diamond was simply known as NICE Field.

Lights were added to Harris Field in the summer of 1975, and it has hosted the NAIA World Series more than twenty times, from 1984 through 1991, and continuously since 2000. In the summer, the ballpark hosts the local American Legion teams, the Lewis-Clark Twins (AA) and Cubs (A). The playing surface at Harris Field was overhauled in the summer of 2014 as earth was rebalanced with heavy equipment.

Lewiston's minor league clubs, the Indians (1937, 1939) and Broncs (1952–1974), played at Bengal Field, about nine blocks east, near the high school. Lights were installed prior to the 1937 baseball season, and the opener was a night game. Owned by the school district, Bengal Field was formerly the home of the high school and Legion baseball programs and hosted the American Legion World Series in 1973. It has been a football-only venue since autumn 1983 and the 3,500-seat baseball grandstand at 15th Street was removed. The LHS Bengals baseball team now plays at Dwight Church Field in the southeast part of the city.

References

External links
Lewis-Clark State College Athletics - Harris Field
2016 NAIA World Series
Stadiums USA - Harris Field
Ballpark Hunter - Harris Field

NAIA World Series venues
College baseball venues in the United States
Baseball venues in Idaho
Lewis–Clark State College